The trap competition at the 1976 Summer Olympics was held on 18–20 July in Montreal, Canada. There were 44 competitors from 29 nations, with each nation limited to two shooters. The event was won by Donald Haldeman of the United States, the nation's first victory in the trap since back-to-back wins in 1912 and 1920. The three total victories tied the United States with Italy for most among nations at the time, though Italy would win the next two and the United States has not win again since (as of the 2016 Games). In this Games, Ubaldesco Baldi of Italy took bronze. Silver went to Armando Marques of Portugal, that nation's first medal in the trap.

Background

This was the 12th appearance of the men's ISSF Olympic trap event. The event was held at every Summer Olympics from 1896 to 1924 (except 1904, when no shooting events were held) and from 1952 to 2016; it was open to women from 1968 to 1996.

Seven of the top 10 shooters from the 1972 Games returned: silver medalist Michel Carrega of France, bronze medalist Silvano Basagni of Italy, fourth-place finisher Burckhardt Hoppe of East Germany, fifth-place finisher Johnny Påhlsson of Sweden, seventh-place finisher John Primrose of Canada, eighth-place finisher Marcos José Olsen of Brazil, and tenth-place finisher Eladio Vallduvi of Spain. Primrose had also been in the top 10 in 1968. Adam Smelczyński of Poland made his sixth appearance in the event; he had taken silver in his first, in 1956. The three World Champions since the last Games were Aleksandr Androshkin of the Soviet Union (1973), Carrega (1974), and Primrose (1975).

Andorra, Guatemala, Iran, Papua New Guinea, and Singapore each made their debut in the event. Great Britain made its 12th appearance, the only nation to have competed at each edition of the event to that point.

Competition format

The competition used the 200-target format introduced with the return of trap to the Olympics in 1952. Only a single round of shooting was done, with all shooters facing 200 targets. Shooting was done in 8 series of 25 targets. The first three series (75 shots) were on day 1, the next three (75 shots) on day 2, and the final two series (50 shots) on day 3.

Records

Prior to this competition, the existing world and Olympic records were as follows. 

No new world or Olympic records were set during the competition.

Schedule

Results

Cerutti was disqualified after it was discovered he had been taking amphetamines. The stimulants didn't help his performance - he finished 43rd out of a field of 44.

References

Trap
Trap at the Olympics